The mayor of New York City is the chief executive of the Government of New York City, as stipulated by New York City's charter. The current officeholder, the 110th in the sequence of regular mayors, is Eric Adams, a member of the Democratic Party.

During the Dutch colonial period from 1624 to 1664, New Amsterdam was governed by the Director of New Netherland. Following the 1664 creation of the British Province of New York, newly renamed New York City was run by the British military governor, Richard Nicolls. The office of Mayor of New York City was established in 1665. Holders were appointed by colonial governors, beginning with Thomas Willett.  The position remained appointed until 1777. That year, during the American Revolution, a Council of Appointment was formed by the State of New York. In 1821 the New York City Council – then known as the Common Council – began appointing mayors. Since 1834, mayors have been elected by direct popular vote.

The city included little beyond the island of Manhattan before 1874, when she annexed the western part of the Bronx, to be followed in 1895 by the rest of the Bronx. The 1898 consolidation created the city as it is today with five boroughs: Manhattan, the Bronx, Brooklyn, Queens, and Staten Island. The first mayor of the expanded city was Robert Anderson Van Wyck.

The longest-serving mayors have been Fiorello H. La Guardia (1934–1945), Robert F. Wagner Jr. (1954–1965), Ed Koch (1978–1989) and Michael Bloomberg (2002–2013), each of whom was in office for twelve years (three successive four-year terms). The shortest terms in office since 1834 have been those of acting mayors: William T. Collins served a single day on December 31, 1925, Samuel B. H. Vance served one month (from November 30 to December 31, 1874), and Thomas Coman served five weeks (from Monday, November 30, 1868, to Monday, January 4, 1869).

Every mayor was white until the election of David Dinkins (1990–1993), the first African American to hold the office (the only other being the current mayor, Eric Adams). New York has not had a Hispanic or Latino mayor, with the possible exception of John Purroy Mitchel (1914–1917), who was of Spanish descent and whose grandfather was born in Venezuela. New York City's mayors have been religiously diverse; the city has had Protestant, Jewish and Catholic mayors. No woman has ever served as mayor of New York City.

Colonial mayors
Before 1680, mayors served one-year terms. From 1680, they served two-year terms. Exceptions are noted thus (*). A dagger (†) indicates mayoralties cut short by death in office. (When the same man served more than one continuous term, his name is lightly shaded purely for clarity, but the tints have no other significance.)

Note
 Peter Delanoy was the first and only directly-elected mayor of New York until 1834. Appointed mayors resumed in the wake of Leisler's Rebellion.

† died in office

Pre-consolidation mayors
The mayor continued to be selected by the Government of New York's Council of Appointment until 1821, when Stephen Allen became the first mayor appointed by a local Common Council. Under the Charter of 1834, mayors were elected annually by direct popular vote. Starting in 1849, mayors were elected to serve two-year terms.

Notes
 John T. Hoffman resigned after his election as Governor of New York state but before the end of his mayoral term. Thomas Coman, President of the Board of Aldermen, completed Hoffman's term as acting mayor until his elected successor, A. Oakey Hall, took office.
 When Hall temporarily retired during the Tweed investigation, the Acting Mayor of New York City was John Cochrane, the President of the New York City Council.
 William F. Havemeyer died during his last term of office. Samuel B. H. Vance, President of the Board of Aldermen, completed Havemeyer's term as acting mayor until his elected successor, William H. Wickham, took office.
 William L. Strong served an additional year in office because New York City mayoral elections were changed to be held in odd-numbered years due to the impending consolidation of New York City.

† died in office

Post-consolidation mayors

The 1898–1901 term was for four years. The City Charter was changed to make the mayor's term a two-year one beginning in 1902, but after two such terms was changed back to resume four-year terms in 1906. George B. McClellan Jr. thus served one two-year term from 1904 to 1905, during which he was elected to a four-year term from 1906 to 1909.

The party of the mayor reflects party registration, as opposed to the party lines run under during the general election.

Notes
 Randolph Gugghenheimer I (born 1846) served as acting mayor in 1900 while Robert A. Van Wyck was away.
 Seth Low previously served as Mayor of the City of Brooklyn from 1882 to 1885.
 William Jay Gaynor died September 10, 1913. Ardolph L. Kline, the unelected President of the Board of Aldermen, succeeded as acting mayor upon Gaynor's death, but then sought re-election as an alderman (successfully) rather than election as mayor. Kline has thus been the only mayor since 1834 never to win a citywide election (having been appointed Vice President of the Board of Aldermen by his colleagues and then succeeding to the presidency mid-term, rather than winning it by popular election at large).
 John Hylan and Police Commissioner Richard Enright resigned December 30, 1925 to ensure that they received their city pensions, which they may not have been entitled to keep had they stayed in office for one more day. William T. Collins became acting Mayor for one day, prior to the inauguration of Jimmy Walker
 Jimmy Walker resigned September 1, 1932 and went to Europe, amid allegations of corruption in his administration. Joseph V. McKee, as President of the Board of Aldermen, became acting mayor in Walker's place, but was then defeated in a special election by John P. O'Brien.
 William O'Dwyer resigned August 31, 1950, during a police corruption scandal, after which he was appointed Ambassador to Mexico by President Harry S. Truman.
 Vincent R. Impellitteri, President of the New York City Council, became acting mayor when O'Dwyer resigned on August 31, 1950, and was then elected to the office in a special election held on November 7, 1950. He was inaugurated on November 14.
 John Lindsay switched party affiliation from Republican to Democrat in 1971 and ran unsuccessfully for the Democratic nomination for president in 1972.
 Michael Bloomberg was a lifelong Democrat before registering as a Republican in 2001 and running for mayor. He then registered as an Independent in 2007, and re-registered as a Democrat in 2018 in preparation for his unsuccessful bid for the Democratic nomination for president in 2020.

† died in office

Appendices

Mayoral terms and term limits in New York City since 1834

Direct elections to the mayoralty of the unconsolidated City of New York began in 1834 for a term of one year, extended to two years after 1849. The 1897 Charter of the consolidated City stipulated that the mayor was to be elected for a single four-year term. In 1901, the term halved to two years, with no restrictions on reelection. In 1905, the term was extended to four years once again. (Mayors Fiorello La Guardia, Robert F. Wagner Jr. and Ed Koch were later able to serve for twelve years each.)  In 1993, the voters approved a two-term (eight-year) limit, and reconfirmed this limit when the issue was submitted to referendum in 1996. In 2008, the New York City Council voted to change the two-term limit to three terms (without submitting the issue to the voters). Legal challenges to the Council's action were rejected by Federal courts in January and April 2009. However, in 2010, yet another referendum, reverting the limit to two terms, passed overwhelmingly.

Principal source: The Encyclopedia of New York City  especially the entries for "charter" and "mayoralty".

 Mayor Strong, elected in 1894, served an extra year because no municipal election was held in 1896, in anticipation of the consolidated City's switch to odd-year elections.
 George B. McClellan Jr. was elected to one two-year term (1904–1905) and one four-year term (1906–1909)
 David Dinkins was not affected by the term limit enacted in 1993 because he had served only one term by 1993 and failed to win re-election.
 The September 11 attacks on the World Trade Center in Manhattan coincided with the primary elections for a successor to Mayor Giuliani, who was completing his second and final term of office. Many were so impressed by both the urgency of the situation and Giuliani's response that they wanted to keep him in office beyond December 31, 2001, either by removing the term limit or by extending his service for a few months. However, neither happened, the primary elections (with the same candidates) were re-run on September 25, the general election was held as scheduled on November 6, and Michael Bloomberg took office on the regularly appointed date of January 1, 2002.
 On October 2, 2008, Michael Bloomberg announced that he would ask the city council to extend the limit for mayor, council and other officers from two terms to three, and that, should such an extended limit prevail, he himself would seek re-election as mayor. On October 23, the New York City Council voted 29–22 to extend the two-term limit to three terms. (A proposed amendment to submit the vote to a public referendum had failed earlier the same day by a vote of 22–28 with one abstention.)
In November 2010, yet another popular referendum, limiting mayoral terms to two, passed overwhelmingly.

Interrupted terms

Mayors John T. Hoffman (1866–68, elected Governor 1868), William Havemeyer (1845–46, 1848–49, and 1873–74), William Jay Gaynor (1910–13), John Francis Hylan (1918–1925), Jimmy Walker (1926–32), and William O'Dwyer (1946–50) failed to complete the final terms to which they were elected. The uncompleted mayoral terms of Hoffman, Walker, and O'Dwyer were added to the other offices elected in (respectively) 1868, 1932, and 1950 [those three elections are listed as "special" in the table below because they occurred before the next regularly scheduled mayoral election; the "regular" mayoral elections of 1874 and 1913, on the other hand, were held on the same day that they would have happened had the mayoralty not become vacant.]

† Became acting mayor as the president of the board of aldermen or (in 1950) city council.

(D) = (Democratic)

(R) = (Republican)

 Mayor Havemeyer was a Democrat who ran as a Republican against the Democratic Tweed Ring in 1872.
 Acting Mayors Coman, Vance, Kline and Collins did not seek election as mayor.
 Acting Mayors McKee and Impellitteri were Democrats who lost the Democratic primary to succeed themselves, but still ran in the general election as independents.
 Elected Mayor Oakey Hall won re-election, while Mayor Wickham did not seek it. Mayors Mitchel and O'Brien lost attempts at re-election, while Mayor Impellitteri did not run for a full term in the 1953 regular general election after losing the Democratic primary.

Mayors of the City of Brooklyn, 1834–1897

Brooklyn elected a mayor from 1834 until consolidation in 1898 into the City of Greater New York, whose own second mayor (1902–1903), Seth Low, had been Mayor of Brooklyn from 1882 to 1885. Since 1898, Brooklyn has, in place of a separate mayor, elected a Borough President.

Mayors of Long Island City, 1870–1897

Long Island City, now within the Borough of Queens, was incorporated as a city in its own right on May 4, 1870 and (like the City of Brooklyn) consolidated into the present Greater New York City on January 1, 1898.

See also
 Election results for Mayor of New York
 History of New York City
 History of Brooklyn
 List of governors of New York

References

External links
 

 
New York City
New York City-related lists